Ernst Winar (3 September 1894 – 28 June 1978) was a Dutch actor and film director. He appeared in 34 films between 1916 and 1955. He also directed 14 films between 1922 and 1955. In 1920 he published Peccavi...???, a then-scandalous novel with a gay protagonist, co-written with fellow actor Adolphe Engers.

Selected filmography

 Majoor Frans (1916)
 La renzoni (1916)
 Gloria transita (1917)
 Ulbo Garvema (1917)
 Toen 't licht verdween (1918)
 Pro domo (1918)
 A Carmen of the North (1919)
 The Devil in Amsterdam (1919)
 Hidden Lives (1920)
 The Flight into Death (1921)
 On the Red Cliff (1922)
 The Man in the Background (1922, directed)
 Comedy of the Heart (1924)
 The Great Opportunity (1925)
 The Company Worth Millions (1925)
 The Proud Silence (1925)
 The Girl on the Road (1925)
 Watch on the Rhine (1926)
 The Dashing Archduke (1927)
 Circus Renz (1927)
 On the Banks of the River Weser (1927)
 Paragraph 182 (1927, directed)
 The Harbour Baron (1928)
 What a Woman Dreams of in Springtime (1929)

References

External links

1894 births
1978 deaths
Dutch male film actors
Dutch male silent film actors
Dutch film directors
People from Leiden